Kim Jong-chul, Kim Jung-chul or Kim Jong-chol, is the name of a number of North Korean people, including:

Kim Jong-chul
Kim Jong-chul (poet)
Kim Jong-chol (athlete)
Kim Jong-chol (footballer, born 1991)
Kim Jung-chul